Headshot is a 2016 Indonesian action film directed by the Mo Brothers. The film stars Iko Uwais as a man with amnesia in a battle against a criminal syndicate to protect the doctor (Chelsea Islan) who saved his life. Headshot premiered on September 9, 2016 at the Toronto International Film Festival and theatrically on December 8, 2016 in Indonesia. It received generally positive reviews from critics.

Plot
In the prologue, mobster Lee (Sunny Pang) escapes from a prison in a shootout that leaves dozens of prisoners and guards dead.

Two months later, a comatose man of unknown identity and origin (Iko Uwais) is being cared for by Dr. Ailin (Chelsea Islan) in a rural hospital on a small island. He eventually wakes up, but with no clear memory of how he was injured or even his name. He adopts the name Ishmael from Moby-Dick, which Ailin is reading. He then learns he was found on the beach by a man named Romli (Yayu Unru).

Meanwhile, Lee and his henchmen Rika (Julie Estelle) and Besi (Very Tri Yulisman) violently eliminate a rival gang. One of the gang's survivors tells Lee about Ishmael, and Lee sends the man to investigate. Ishmael and the thug have a brief altercation after the man threatens Ailin. Ailin travels to the mainland to seek better care for Ishmael, but her bus is stopped by Lee's men, who are looking for Ishmael (who they call Abdi). They slaughter all the passengers except Ailin and a young girl, whom they abduct.

Called by Ailin, Ishmael and Romli hurry to the scene of the bus attack. Ishmael kills a few of Lee's thugs who remain at the scene, but Romli is also killed. An Interpol agent tells Ishmael about children abducted by Lee's syndicate and bred to be devoted smugglers and criminal enforcers; Ishmael was one of these children. The agent is killed when a group of Lee's assassins attack the police station in an attempt to take out Ishmael/Abdi. Ishmael puts down the attackers instead and escapes.

Ishmael must then go to war with the syndicate to save Ailin. While traveling, he encounters Besi near a well, and it is revealed that he, Besi and Rika trained together. Lee would put children in the well and starve them. After a few days, he would put food in there, and the child who killed all the others to get the food would be freed. Ishmael tries to persuade Besi to not be on Lee's side, but Besi refuses out of loyalty. They then begin to fight and Ishmael manages to gain the upper hand, killing Besi with a strong hit to the head. After Besi dies, Rika discovers his corpse and attacks Ishmael on the beach.

Ishmael eventually defeats Rika despite receiving multiple wounds from the latter, and it is revealed that Rika was the one who shot Ishmael and gave him amnesia in the first place. Rika takes advantage of the distraction and holds Ishmael at gunpoint, but she can't bring herself to shoot Ishmael again. She instead shoots away from him, wasting her bullets. In the confusion, Ishmael accidentally mortally injures Rika by reflexively throwing a knife. After comforting Rika in her dying moments, Ishmael finds Lee's hideout.

Meanwhile, in the hideout, a henchman is about to rape Ailin, but Ailin and the child fight him off, eventually shooting him with his own rifle. Ishmael and Ailin meet each other during the chaos, with Ailin initially hostile to Ishmael due to their relationship resulting in her kidnapping. Ishmael manages to convince her not to, and they mutually embrace. However, Lee arrives, and is enraged that Ishmael killed both Besi and Rika, whom he had considered his favorite "children." They then enter a brutal fight, with Lee gaining the upper hand due to his strength. However, Ishmael finally beats Lee outside, and impales him on the sharp branch of a tree trunk. In a last-ditch effort, Lee attempts to kill Ishmael by impaling him on the same sharp tree trunk, but Ailin saves Ishmael. Lee finally succumbs to his wounds, and dies.

In the aftermath, Ailin is recovering in the hospital, with Ishmael wounded severely. However, he wakes up with Ailin by his side and Ailin smiles, hinting at a possible rekindling between the two.

Cast
 Iko Uwais as Ishmael a.k.a. Abdi
 Chelsea Islan as Dr. Ailin
 Sunny Pang as Lee
 Julie Estelle as Rika
 David Hendrawan as Tejo 
 Zack Lee as Tano
 Very Tri Yulisman as Besi
 Bront Palarae as Interpol Agent Ali
 Yayu Unru as Romli
 Ario Bayu as Jakarta Police Captain
 Hirooki Goto as Japanese Thug (cameo)

Production
Headshot was directed by Timo Tjahjanto and Kimo Stamboel, known as The Mo Brothers, who had never directed an action film before. Timo wrote the storyline in two and a half weeks and claimed that "it may be the fastest story I've ever produced." The film was produced by Screenplay Infinite Films. Besides starring in the film, Iko Uwais also led the choreography team for three weeks. In the film, every character has their own fighting style, such as silat, wushu, or brutal fighting, based on the background of the actor.

Soundtrack 
A soundtrack album was released by the production house and featured Andre Harihandoyo dan Sonic People who contributed the song "Impostor Heart".

Release
Headshot was first screened at the 2016 Toronto International Film Festival on 9 September 2016. The film was screened twice on 24 & 29 September in Fantastic Fest, Austin. On 4 October, the film was screened at Beyond Fest in Los Angeles. It was also screened at Mayhem Film Festival 2016 on October 13. It was also screened at the 30th Leeds International Film Festival on 13–14 November.

In Indonesia, Headshot was premiered on 19 November 2016 in Bandung and 20 November in Makassar. The film was released into theaters on 8 December.

Reception 
Headshot received generally positive reviews. , the film holds a 72% approval rating on Rotten Tomatoes, based on 47 reviews with an average rating of 6.23 out of 10. On Metacritic, it has an aggregated score of 61 out of 100, meaning "generally favorable reviews".

Dennis Harvey of Variety wrote that "In terms of sheer, punchy physical vigor, Headshot is a knockout." Headshot received 4 out of 5 stars from The Guardian, where Wendy Ide called it "the most insanely violent film of the year" and wrote that "Thrilling fight scenes and dizzyingly relentless action elevate this Indonesian adventure to headspinning heights". Simon Abrams of RogerEbert.com gave Headshot 2.5 stars out of 4 and wrote that "Blood-soaked Indonesian martial arts flick Headshot is for anyone who liked The Bourne Identity, but wished it were way more violent."

Some reviewers considered the film repetitive, excessive, or both. David Ehrlich of IndieWire wrote that the film is a "brutally exhausting bloodbath", saying that "As the movie stretches deep into its second hour, it's easy to start resenting the fact that everybody gets shot with 20 bullets when one would do." Collider's Matt Goldberg gave the movie "D", criticizing that "a movie that should have been a lean actioner instead runs almost two hours even though it's just a damsel-in-distress story... Eventually, fight fatigue sets in and we know that the directors aren't going to do anything to surprise us."

Awards and nominations

References

External links 

Headshot at Metacritic

2016 films
2016 action films
Films set in Indonesia
Films shot in Indonesia
2016 independent films
2010s Indonesian-language films
2016 martial arts films
Vertical Entertainment films
Indonesian martial arts films
Films directed by the Mo Brothers